Town to Town is an album by guitarist Phil Keaggy, released in 1981, on Sparrow Records.

Track listing
All songs written by Phil Keaggy, unless otherwise noted.

 Side one
 "Wished You Were There"  – 3:04
 "Full Circle"  – 4:23
 "Life Love and You"  – 4:29
 "Town to Town"  – 6:49

 Side two
 "What a Wonder You Are" – 4:03
 "In Between"  – 3:04
 "Our Lives"  – 5:28
 "Rise up O Men of God" (music: Keaggy; words: traditional/Keaggy)  – 4:13
 "Let Everything Else Go"  – 4:53

Note:  On the CD release of this (three LPs on two CDs), the tracks from side one are in reverse order.

Personnel
Phil Keaggy: guitars, bass & vocals
Leon Gaer: bass
Dean Hagen & Jim Delong: drums
Alex Acuña: percussion
Richard Souther: synthesizer
Tom Keene: synthesizer, Fender Rhodes, piano
Dan Murdoch: Rhodes piano
Lee Jones: fretless bass
Curt Bartlett: additional guitar
Michele Pillar: duet vocal on "What a Wonder You Are"
Bernadette Keaggy: partial lead vocal on "Our Lives"
Background vocals by Bruce Hibbard, Michele Pillar, The Winans, Peter York

Production notes
Produced by Bob Cotton and Phil Keaggy
Arranged by Phil Keaggy
Engineered by Bob Cotton
 Recorded at Sound Recorders, Kansas City, Kansas; Paramount Recording Studios, Hollywood, California

References

1981 albums
Phil Keaggy albums